Citrus City is a census-designated place (CDP) in Hidalgo County, Texas. The population was 3,291 at the 2020 US Census. It is part of the McAllen–Edinburg–Mission Metropolitan Statistical Area. The town was founded in 1943 during World War II by Howard Moffitt, a builder known for his vernacular Moffitt cottage architectural style, as part of a planned regional orange and grapefruit growing community. The local irrigation system proved to be too saline for fruit production, and the plans for a large town were revised. A few Moffitt houses survive in Citrus City.

Geography
Citrus City is located at  (26.327092, -98.390987).

Demographics
As of the census of 2000, there were 941 people, 203 households, and 190 families residing in the CDP. The population density was 463.0 people per square mile (179.0/km2). There were 222 housing units at an average density of 109.2/sq mi (42.2/km2). The racial makeup of the CDP was 13.28% White, 0.21% African American, 85.76% from other races, and 0.74% from two or more races. Hispanic or Latino of any race were 98.72% of the population.

There were 203 households, out of which 67.5% had children under the age of 18 living with them, 74.4% were married couples living together, 15.3% had a female householder with no husband present, and 6.4% were non-families. 5.4% of all households were made up of individuals, and 2.0% had someone living alone who was 65 years of age or older. The average household size was 4.64 and the average family size was 4.68.

In the CDP, the population was spread out, with 43.1% under the age of 18, 13.8% from 18 to 24, 29.3% from 25 to 44, 11.1% from 45 to 64, and 2.7% who were 65 years of age or older. The median age was 21 years. For every 100 females, there were 94.4 males. For every 100 females age 18 and over, there were 89.7 males.

The median income for a household in the CDP was $15,278, and the median income for a family was $14,667. Males had a median income of $15,972 versus $14,886 for females. The per capita income for the CDP was $6,117. About 49.4% of families and 47.8% of the population were below the poverty line, including 45.2% of those under age 18 and 54.8% of those age 65 or over.

Education
Citrus City is served by the La Joya Independent School District.

Zoned schools include:
 Sections are zoned to Juan M. Seguin Elementary School while others are zoned to Dr. Mendiola Elementary School
 Some are zoned to J. D. Salinas Middle School while others are zoned to A. Richards Middle School
 Juarez-Lincoln High School

In addition, South Texas Independent School District operates magnet schools that serve the community.

References

Census-designated places in Hidalgo County, Texas
Census-designated places in Texas